Gerald Stack Maloney  (September 5, 1901 - May, 1976) was a professional football player who spent three seasons in the National Football League with the Providence Steam Roller, New York Yankees and the Boston Bulldogs. Red also played in the first American Football League with the Yankees, in 1926 and followed that team to the NFL the very next season.

Notes

1901 births
1976 deaths
People from Ware, Massachusetts
Players of American football from Massachusetts
Boston Bulldogs (NFL) players
New York Yankees (NFL) players
New York Yankees (AFL) players
Providence Steam Roller players
Dartmouth Big Green football players